The North China Plain or Huang-Huai-Hai Plain is a large-scale downfaulted rift basin formed in the late Paleogene and Neogene and then modified by the deposits of the Yellow River. It is the largest alluvial plain of China. The plain is bordered to the north by the Yanshan Mountains, to the west by the Taihang Mountains, to the south by the Dabie Mountains, and to the east by the Yellow Sea and Bohai Sea. The Yellow River flows through the plain, before its waters empty into the Bohai Sea.

The part of the North China Plain around the banks of the middle and lower Yellow River is commonly referred to as the Central Plain. This portion of the North China Plain formed the cradle of Chinese civilization, and is the region from which the Han Chinese people emerged.

Beijing, the capital of China, is located on the northeast edge of the plain, with Tianjin, an important industrial city and commercial port, near its northeast coast. Jinan (the capital of Shandong province) and Zhengzhou (the capital of Henan province) lie on the plain as well, along the banks of the Yellow River. Additionally, the capitals of several Imperial Chinese dynasties were located on the plain, including Luoyang (which at various points was the capital of the Han, Jin, Sui, and Tang dynasties) and Kaifeng (the capital of the Northern Song dynasty).

The multipurpose Xiaolangdi Dam marks the location of the Yellow River's last valley before its waters flow onto the North China Plain, a great delta created from silt deposited at the Yellow River's mouth over millennia. The North China Plain encompasses much of Henan, Hebei, and Shandong provinces, as well as the northern portions of Jiangsu and Anhui. Further south, the North China Plain merges with the similarly flat Yangtze Delta.

The North China Plain is fertile, and it is one of the most densely populated regions in the world. The plain is one of China's most important agricultural regions, producing wheat, maize, sorghum, millet, peanuts, sesame seed, cotton, and various vegetables. It is the main area of sorghum, millet, maize, and cotton production in China. In the eastern part of the plain, Shandong's Shengli Oil Field serves as an important petroleum base. Due to its yellow soil, the North China Plain's nickname is "Land of the yellow earth".

Historical significance
The geography of the North China Plain has had profound cultural and political implications. Unlike areas to the south of the Yangtze, the plain generally runs uninterrupted by mountains and has far fewer rivers. As a result, communication by horse is rapid within the plain, and the spoken language of the plain is relatively uniform, in contrast to the plethora of languages and dialects in southern China. In addition the possibility of rapid communication has meant that the political center of China has tended to be located here.

Because the fertile soil of the North China Plain gradually merges with the steppes and deserts of Dzungaria, Inner Mongolia, and Northeast China, the plain has been prone to invasion from nomadic or semi-nomadic tribes originating from those regions, prompting the construction of the Great Wall of China. 
Although the soil of the North China Plain is fertile, the weather is unpredictable, being at the intersection of humid winds from the Pacific and dry winds from the interior of the Asian continent.  This makes the plain prone to both floods and drought.  Moreover, the flatness of the plain promotes massive flooding when river works are damaged. Many historians have proposed that these factors have encouraged the development of a centralized Chinese state to manage granaries, maintain hydraulic works, and administer fortifications against the steppe peoples. (The "hydraulic society" school holds that early states developed in the valleys of the Nile, Euphrates, Indus and Yellow Rivers due to the need to supervise large numbers of laborers to build irrigation canals and control floods.)

Philosophically, the North China Plain was also the birthplace of Confucius, the traditional patriarch of East Asian philosophy. Confucius lived and taught in the State of Lu from 551 to 479 BCE. His teachings, recorded in The Analects, eventually became the school of thought known as Confucianism. Tied to the Classical Chinese writing system, Confucianism swept throughout China and onto Korea, Japan, and Vietnam, heavily influencing their respective  political, legal, and educational bureaucracies.

References

External links
Encyclopædia Britannica: "North China Plain"

 
Regions of China